Fritz Rémond Jr. (1902–1976) was a German actor of stage, film and television.

Selected filmography
 When a Woman Loves (1950)
 Oh, You Dear Fridolin (1952)
 Captain Bay-Bay (1953)
 I Was an Ugly Girl (1955)
 Night of Decision (1956)
 That's No Way to Land a Man (1959)
 The Red Hand (1960)
 Life Begins at Eight (1962)

References

Bibliography 
 Christoph Schwandt. Oper in Köln: von den Anfängen bis zur Gegenwart. Dittrich, 2007.

External links 
 

1902 births
1976 deaths
German male stage actors
German male film actors
German male television actors
Actors from Karlsruhe